Flushing may refer to:

Places
 Flushing, Cornwall, a village in the United Kingdom
 Flushing, Queens, New York City
 Flushing Bay, a bay off the north shore of Queens
 Flushing Chinatown (法拉盛華埠), a community in Queens
 Flushing Meadows, a park in Queens which includes multiple venue, such as the location of the US Open tennis tournament
 Flushing River, in Queens
 Flushing, Michigan, a city in Genesee County
 Flushing, Netherlands, an English name for the city of Vlissingen, Netherlands
 Flushing, Ohio, a village in Belmont County
 The Flushing, a building in Suffolk, England
 Flushing Township, Belmont County, Ohio
 Flushing Township, Michigan

Other uses
 Flushing (military tactic), related to skirmishing
 Flushing (physiology), the warm, red condition of human skin
 Flushing dog, a hunting dog
 Flushing hydrant, a device to flush water mains
 Flushing Remonstrance, a demand for religious liberty made to Peter Stuyvesant, the Governor of the Dutch colony of New Netherland, in 1657

See also

 Vlissingen (disambiguation), also called "Flushing"
 
 
 Flush (disambiguation)